John Edward 'Jack' Spence (born 11 June 1931) is a British academic and has been a Professor of Diplomacy at the Department of War Studies, King's College London since 1997.

Spence was educated at Pretoria Boys High School, South Africa; the University of Witwatersrand; and the London School of Economics. He has lectured at a variety of Universities in Britain, South Africa and the United States and was Professor of Politics and Pro-Vice Chancellor at the University of Leicester (1973-1991). He was employed as Director of Studies at the Royal Institute of International Affairs (1991-1997).

In 2002, Spence was appointed to the Order of the British Empire for teaching services to the Ministry of Defence.

Bibliography
Republic Under Pressure (1965)
Lesotho - Politics of Dependence (1968)
Political and Military Framework of Investment in South Africa (1976)
British Politics in Perspective (ed with R Borthwick, 1985)
Change in South Africa (1994)
Violence in Southern Africa (1997)
After Mandela: The 1999 South African Election (1999)
Seaford House Papers (2000–08)
Ending Apartheid (with D Welsh, 2011)

References

Living people
1931 births
University of the Witwatersrand alumni
Alumni of the London School of Economics
English people of South African descent
Academics of King's College London
Academics of the University of Leicester
Academics of Swansea University
Officers of the Order of the British Empire
Vice-Chancellors of the University of Leicester
Fellows of King's College London